Slatina Pokupska is a village in Croatia. It is connected by the D31 highway.

Populated places in Sisak-Moslavina County
Glina, Croatia